William Thomson Young  (22 March 1912 – 18 October 2012) was an Australian politician.

Born in Scotland, he was appointed a Commander of the Order of the British Empire (OBE) in 1971, for services as Warden of the Municipality of Burnie. Also in that year he was elected to the Tasmanian Legislative Council as the independent member for West Devon. He had previously contested the federal seat of Braddon for the Liberal Party in 1961. Young died in November 2012.

References

1912 births
2012 deaths
Independent members of the Parliament of Tasmania
Members of the Tasmanian Legislative Council
Australian Commanders of the Order of the British Empire
Australian justices of the peace
Scottish emigrants to Australia